Richard Terrance "Terry" McDermott (nicknamed "The Essexville Rocket", born September 20, 1940) is an American gold and silver medal-winning Olympic speed skater.

McDermott was a surprise winner in the 500 m at the 1964 Winter Olympics in Innsbruck when he beat the favorite in that distance, reigning Olympic champion Yevgeny Grishin, by half a second. His coach at the time was Leo Freisinger, the 500 m bronze medal winner of the 1936 Winter Olympics. McDermott's international career consisted exclusively of the 500 m at the Olympic Winter Games of 1960, 1964 and 1968. In 1968 he skated in unfavorable conditions, late in the day when the sun melted the ice. Yet he finished only 0.2 seconds behind the winner.

McDermott was inducted in the National Speedskating Hall of Fame on June 4, 1977. At the 1980 Winter Olympics in Lake Placid, McDermott took the Olympic Oath representing the judges.

McDermott worked as a barber from 1963 to 1967, and after that as a manufacturer's representative in the Detroit area. In parallel he served as a speed skating official. On February 9, 1964, he was a guest on The Ed Sullivan Show, an appearance that was overshadowed by the first U.S. performance of The Beatles. He currently resides in Bloomfield Hills, Michigan. He is married to Virginia, and has five children and an elder sister Marilyn.

References

External links

 Eng, Trond. All Time International Championships, Complete results 1889–2002. Askim, Norway, WSSSA Skøytenytt, 2002.
 Terry McDermott at SkateResults.com

1940 births
Living people
American male speed skaters
Speed skaters at the 1960 Winter Olympics
Speed skaters at the 1964 Winter Olympics
Speed skaters at the 1968 Winter Olympics
Sportspeople from Michigan
Olympic gold medalists for the United States in speed skating
Olympic silver medalists for the United States in speed skating
Olympic officials
Medalists at the 1964 Winter Olympics
Medalists at the 1968 Winter Olympics
Oath takers at the Olympic Games